The following list mentions notable people who were born in or lived in Minneapolis, Minnesota, in the United States, and gained recognition.

Academia

Sumner McKnight Crosby - art historian and professor of art history at Yale University

Activists
 
Dennis Banks - Native American leader
Clyde Bellecourt - Native American leader
Sharon Sayles Belton - politician
Brian Coyle - gay rights activist
W. Harry Davis - civil rights activist
Paulette Fink - French-born Jewish activist
Catharine MacKinnon - lawyer and teacher
Cecil Newman - publisher, Urban League president
Sean Sherman - indigenous foods activist
Theodore Wirth - planned the city's park system

Artists

Mary Abbott - artist
Barkhad Abdi - actor
Corey Adam - stand-up comedian
Faysal Ahmed - actor
Eddie Albert - actor
Ernest Dewey Albinson - artist
Richard Dean Anderson - actor
The Andrews Sisters - singers
Siah Armajani - sculptor and architect
James Arness - actor
Babes in Toyland - band
Leslie Barlow - visual artist, painting, drawing, mixed-media
Jason Behr - actor
Beatrice Gjertsen Bessesen – operatic soprano
Robert Bly - poet
Steven Brust - novelist
Hazel Buckham - actress
Mo Collins - actress and comedian
Craig Finn - singer/songwriter
 Suzanne Finstad, author
Alan Freed - free radio activist and media personality
Larry Gates - actor
Terry Gilliam - director and member of Monty Python
Peter Graves - actor
Daniel Grodnik - writer/movie producer
Molly Hagan - actress
Carol M. Highsmith - photographer
George Roy Hill - director
James Hong - actor
Dakota Dave Hull - musician
Information Society - band
Mason Jennings - musician
Linda Kelsey  - actress
Ward Kimball - Walt Disney animator
T. R. Knight - actor
June Lang - actress
Jimmy Jam and Terry Lewis - musicians
Maud Hart Lovelace - author
Carl Lumbly - actor
Dorothy Lyman - actress, director, producer
Cornell MacNeil - of the Metropolitan Opera
Ralph Meeker - actor
Michael J. Nelson - comedian 
Ade Olufeko - digital artist
George Morrison - artist
Westbrook Pegler - journalist
Prince - musician
Randy Resnick - musician
Prof - musician
Charles M. Schulz - creator of Charlie Brown and the Peanuts gang
Lili St. Cyr - stripper
Brian Setzer - Stray Cats
Clifford D. Simak - author
Alfred Skrenda - illustrator 
Jack Smight - filmmaker
Alec Soth - photographer
Norman Spencer - musician
Curt Swan - cartoonist, pencil artist of Superman for D.C. Comics from 1940s to 1980s
Nick Swardson - actor, comedian 
Bruce Swedien - Grammy Award-winning audio engineer and music producer; known for his work with Quincy Jones and Michael Jackson
John Szarkowski - photographer
Maria Cristina Tavera - artist  
Tiny Tim - TV personality
Michael Todd - producer
The Jets, band
Anne Tyler - novelist
Gerald Vizenor - author
Paul Westerberg - musician
Dan Wilson - musician
Lizz Winstead - comedian, co-creator of The Daily Show
After The Burial - band

Business
 

Curt Carlson - founder of Carlson Companies
George Dayton - founder of Target Corporation
William Hood Dunwoody - businessman and co-founder General Mills and Wells Fargo
J. Paul Getty - founder of Getty Oil
Doron Jensen - co-founder of Timber Lodge Steakhouse and Old Country Buffet
Franklin and Forrest Mars -  founders of Mars, Incorporated
Steve McClellan - general manager of First Avenue
Peter Najarian - options trader and television personality
John S. Pillsbury - co-founder of  Pillsbury Company
Richard Sears - co-founder of Sears
Rose Totino - co-founder of Totino's frozen pizza

Government
Hussein Sheikh Abdirahman - politician and judge, former Minister of Defence of Somalia (1989–1990)
George Edwin Anderson - Minnesota state legislator and businessman
Marvin Harold Anderson - Minnesota state legislator and businessman
John R. Arlandson - Minnesota state legislator and lawyer
Samuel H. Bellman, Minnesota state legislator and lawyer
Thomas K. Berg - Minnesota state legislator and lawyer
Alfred L. Bergerud - Minnesota state legislator, businessman, and lawyer
LeRoy Earl Brophey Sr. - Minnesota state legislator and lawyer
Margaret Mary Byrne - Minnesota state legislator
Walter H. Campbell - Minnesota state legislator, businessman, and lawyer
James R. Casserly - Minnesota state legislator and lawyer
George C. Dahlvang - Minnesota state representative
John Cheatham - firefighter
Mark Dayton - Governor of Minnesota
Calvin Deming - Minnesota state representative
Philip S. Duff - Minnesota state senator and newspaper editor
Keith Ellison - Minnesota Attorney General, former member of the United States House of Representatives (2003-2019)
William S. Ervin - former Minnesota Attorney General
Douglas Ewald - consultant and Minnesota state representative
George A. French - lawyer and Minnesota state representative
Paul Willis Guilford - Minnesota state legislator, lawyer, and judge
Carl G. Hagland - labor activist and Minnesota state representative
Harold Harrison - businessman and Minnesota state legislator
Andrew Osborne Hayfield - businessman and Minnesota state representative
Hubert Humphrey - U.S. Vice President
Robert C. Jensen - Minnesota state legislator and farmer
Raymond J. Julkowski - Minnesota state representative and lawyer
Harold Kalina - Minnesota state senator and judge
Stephen Keefe - Minnesota state senator and chemist
Burton L. Kingsley _ Minnesota state legislator and businessman
Herman J. Kording- Minnesota state legislator and farmer
Adolph Kvam - Minnesota state representative and businessman
Bob Latz - Minnesota state representative and lawyer
Ron Latz - Minnesota state senator and lawyer
John George Lennon - Minnesota state legislator and businessman
Leonard E. Lindquist - Minnesota state legislator and lawyer
Carl L. Lyse - Minnesota state legislator and businessman
Robert George Marshall - Minnesota state senator and businessman
Eugene McCarthy - U.S. Senator
Walter Mondale - U.S. Vice President
Gerald T. Mullin - Minnesota state legislator, businessman, and lawyer
George E. Murk - Minnesota state representative
Dennis Newinski - Minnesota state representative and machinist
Lauris Norstad - Supreme Commander Europe NATO (The 2nd highest rank by prominabce in NATO)
Harmon T. Ogdahl - Minnesota state senator and businessman
Alan Page - Minnesota Supreme Court justice; former NFL defensive lineman and Pro Football Hall of Fame inductee
Wilber L. Paulson - Minnesota state legislator and businessman
Donna C. Peterson - Minnesota state legislator and educator
Eric D. Petty - Minnesota state senator and businessman
Bradley G. Pieper - Minnesota state representative
Jim Rice - Minnesota state representative
Charles W. Root - lawyer and politician
Herman W. Sachtjen - member of the Wisconsin State Assembly and jurist
Donald Savelkoul - lawyer and politician
David D. Schaaf - Minnesota state senator and florist
John Day Smith - Minnesota state legislator, judge, and lawyer
Clifford C. Sommer - Minnesota state senator and businessman
James C. Swanson - Minnesota state legislator and educator
Samuel R. Thayer - ambassador to the Netherlands in the Benjamin Harrison administration
Jesse Ventura - former professional wrestler, actor, and Governor of Minnesota
Carl O. Wegner - lawyer and politician
Vernon S. Welch - Minnesota state representative and lawyer
Frank E. Wheelock - a founder and first mayor of Lubbock, Texas, reared in Minneapolis
Bruce D. Williamson - Minnesota state representative
Edwin M. Wold - Minnesota state representative
Kenneth W. Wolfe - Minnesota state senator

Military
 Harold Palmer Howard, U.S. Army brigadier general

Science

Peter Agre - physician, biologist, Nobel Laureate
Earl Bakken - engineer, philanthropist
Norman Borlaug - agronomist
Paul D. Boyer - chemist, Nobel Laureate
Ian Coldwater - computer security specialist
David E. Garfin - biophysicist
Robert R. Gilruth - directed the U.S. Moon landing
Leonid Hurwicz - economist, academician
Finn E. Kydland - economist
Edward B. Lewis - geneticist, Nobel Prize Winner
C. Walton Lillehei - surgeon, open-heart pioneer
Marcia McNutt - president National Academy of Sciences
Bradford Parkinson - father of the Global Positioning System
Jeannette Piccard - pioneer of balloonists
Edward C. Prescott - economist, Nobel Prize
John Tate - mathematician

Sports
Andrew Alberts - National Hockey League player
Russ Anderson - National Hockey League player
Nate Augspurger - rugby player
David Backes - National Hockey League player
Garrett Bender - rugby union player
Casey Borer - National Hockey League player
Rebekkah Brunson - basketball player and coach
Dustin Byfuglien - National Hockey League player
Dominique Byrd - professional football player
Cully Dahlstrom - National Hockey League player
Joe Dziedzic - National Hockey League player
Chad Erickson - National Hockey League player
Larry Fitzgerald - professional football player
Rusty Fitzgerald - National Hockey League player
Jake Gardiner - National Hockey League player
Gabriele Grunewald - professional runner
Joe Hennig - professional wrestler
Kent Hrbek - MLB first baseman
Janet Jamieson - All-American Girls Professional Baseball League player
Tom Kurvers - National Hockey League player
Reed Larson - National Hockey League player
Brock Lesnar - professional wrestler and mixed martial artist
Ryan Lindgren - National Hockey League player
Dave Menne - mixed martial artist
Brock Nelson - National Hockey League player
Zach Parise - National Hockey League player
Nick Perbix - National Hockey League player
Paul Sather - College men's basketball coach
Kyle Shanahan - football coach
Jalen Suggs - Orlando Magic PG / SG
Terrell Suggs - Kansas City Chiefs defensive end / linebacker
Matt Tennyson - National Hockey League player
John Thomas (born 1975) - basketball player
Hal Trumble - ice hockey administrator and referee
Lyle Wright - businessman, events promoter, United States Hockey Hall of Fame inductee

See also 

List of people from Minnesota

References

Minneapolis
Minneapolis